Elitsa Atanasova Yankova (18 September 1994) is a Bulgarian freestyle wrestler. She participated in the 48 kg competition in 2016 Summer Olympics and won a bronze medal. This became the first 2016 Olympics medal for Bulgaria.

As an adolescent, Yankova had ambitions for short-distance running in track and field, but later switched to freestyle wrestling. Her father, Atanas Yankov, is a former Greco-Roman wrestler.

In 2009, Yankova, though she failed to secure a spot at the European Championships, was noticed by coach Petar Kasabov, who convinced her to start training under him with the Levski sports club. In 2013, she became a junior world champion. She also holds a number of national titles. In 2015, Yankova damaged her spine, but recovered and returned to wrestling.

Yankova's hobby is folk dancing. She is a student at the South-West University.

References

External links
 

Olympic wrestlers of Bulgaria
Bulgarian female sport wrestlers
Wrestlers at the 2016 Summer Olympics
Medalists at the 2016 Summer Olympics
Olympic medalists in wrestling
Olympic bronze medalists for Bulgaria
1994 births
Living people
Sportspeople from Varna, Bulgaria
European Games medalists in wrestling
European Games silver medalists for Bulgaria
European Wrestling Championships medalists
21st-century Bulgarian women